Divénié District is a district in the Niari Region of south-western Republic of the Congo. The capital lies at Divénié.

Towns and villages

References

Niari Department
Districts of the Republic of the Congo